Escamilla is a surname. Notable people with the surname include:

Cuitlahuac Condado Escamilla (born 1978), Mexican politician
Dolores Guadalupe García Escamilla (c. 1966–2005), Mexican crime reporter and anchorwoman
Ignacio Escamilla (born 1967), Mexican swimmer
Jorge Escamilla (born 1995), Mexican footballer
Juan Carlos Escamilla (born 1978), American politician
Kevin Escamilla (born 1994), Mexican footballer
Raymundo Escamilla (born 1964), Mexican politician